The 2010 United States House of Representatives elections in Oregon were held on November 2, 2010, to determine who would represent the state of Oregon in the United States House of Representatives. Oregon has five seats in the House, apportioned according to the 2000 United States Census. All five incumbents, four Democrats and one Republican, were re-elected to another term. Representatives were elected for two-year terms to serve in the 112th Congress from January 3, 2011 until January 3, 2013; however, re-elected Congressman David Wu resigned partway through his term on August 3, 2011, and a special election was held to fill the rest of his unexpired term.

A primary election for Democrats and Republicans was held on May 18. Other parties have other procedures for nominating candidates.

Overview

By district
Results of the 2010 United States House of Representatives elections in Oregon by district:

District 1

Incumbent Democrat David Wu has represented Oregon's 1st congressional district since 1998 and was re-elected to a seventh term in 2010, defeating sports marketing consultant Rob Cornilles, who won the Republican primary.

In 2008, Wu won with 71% of the vote. He faced no Republican opponent because the winner of the Republican primary, Joel Haugen, changed his affiliation to the Independent Party of Oregon after his endorsement of Democrat Barack Obama for President drew objections from Republican party leaders.

Democratic primary

Candidates
 David Robinson, businessman and U.S. Naval Academy teacher
 David Wu, incumbent U.S. Representative

Results

Republican primary

Candidates
 Stephan Andrew Brodhead, real estate portfolio manager
 Rob Cornilles, sports marketing consultant
 Douglas Fitzgerald Keller, retired Naval aviator
 John Kuzmanich, businessman

Results

General election

Candidates
 Rob Cornilles (Republican), sports marketing consultant
 Chris Henry ( Pacific Green, Progressive), truck driver
 Don LaMunyon (Constitution), research chemist
 H. Joe Tabor (Libertarian), self-employed consultant
 David Wu (Democrat), incumbent U.S. Representative

Polling

Results

District 2

Incumbent Republican Greg Walden has represented Oregon's 2nd congressional district since 1998, and was re-elected to a seventh term in 2010, defeating Democrat Joyce Segers, a writer from Ashland. Both candidates were unopposed in their respective primaries.

Democratic primary

Candidates
 Joyce B. Segers, writer (unopposed)

Republican primary

Candidates
 Greg Walden, incumbent U.S. Representative (unopposed)

General election

Candidates
 Joyce B. Segers (Democrat), writer
 Greg Walden (Republican), incumbent U.S. Representative

Results

District 3

Incumbent Democrat Earl Blumenauer has represented Oregon's 3rd congressional district since 1996 and was re-elected to an eighth term in 2010. In 2008, he took 75% of the vote. He faced a rematch with his 2008 Republican opponent, Delia Lopez, a real estate investor from Oakland, Oregon.

Democratic primary

Candidates
 Earl Blumenauer, incumbent
 John Sweeney, land management consultant

Results

Republican primary

Candidates
 Delia Lopez, homemaker and real estate investor (unopposed)

General election

Candidates
 Earl Blumenauer (Democrat), incumbent U.S. Representative
 Jeff Lawrence (Independent, Libertarian), attorney and policy director
 Delia Lopez (Republican), homemaker and real estate investor
 Michael Meo (Pacific Green, Progressive), high school and college mathematics teacher

Results

Campaign Finance
As of September 30, 2010.  Source: Federal Election Commission

District 4

Incumbent Democrat Peter DeFazio, the senior member of Oregon's House delegation, was re-elected to a 13th term in 2010, defeating chemist Arthur B. Robinson, winner of the Republican primary. DeFazio had briefly considered a run for Governor of Oregon. He has represented Oregon's 4th congressional district since 1986. In 2008, with no Republican opposition, he won 82% of the vote.

Democratic primary

Candidates
 Peter DeFazio, incumbent U.S. Representative (unopposed)

Republican primary
Springfield mayor Sid Leiken announced his candidacy as a Republican, but dropped it in March 2010 to run for a seat on the Lane County Board of Commissioners. Leiken had faced controversy over money paid to his campaign that he said was reimbursement for a poll conducted by his mother's company. No documentation existed for the payment, which is a possible violation of Oregon election laws.

Candidates
 Jaynee Germond, small business owner
 Arthur B. Robinson, chemist

Results

General election

Candidates
 Michael Beilstein  (Pacific Green), chemist
 Peter DeFazio (Democrat, Progressive, Working Families), incumbent U.S. Representative
 Arthur B. Robinson (Constitution, Independent, Republican), chemist

Polling

Generic Democrat vs. generic Republican

Results

District 5

Schrader was first elected in 2008, winning against Republican nominee Mike Erickson after six-term Democratic incumbent Darlene Hooley announced her retirement. The district is usually the most competitive in Oregon, though it has become more Democratic in recent years.

Democratic primary

Candidates
 Kurt Schrader, incumbent U.S. Representative (unopposed)

Republican primary

Candidates
 Scott Bruun, Oregon State Representative from West Linn
 Fred Thompson, former Georgia-Pacific executive

Results

General election

Candidates
 Scott Bruun (Independent, Republican), Oregon State Representative
 Chris Lugo (Pacific Green, Progressive), journalist
 Kurt Schrader (Democrat), incumbent U.S. Representative

Polling

Results

See also
 United States House of Representatives elections, 2010
 Oregon state elections, 2010
 United States Senate election in Oregon, 2010
 Oregon gubernatorial election, 2010

References

External links
 U.S. Congress Candidates for Oregon at Project Vote Smart
 Oregon U.S. House from OurCampaigns.com
 Campaign contributions for U.S. Congressional races in Oregon from OpenSecrets
 2010 Oregon General Election graph of multiple polls from Pollster.com

 House - Oregon from the Cook Political Report

Oregon
2010
House